NGC 3384 is an elliptical galaxy in the constellation Leo. The galaxy was discovered by William Herschel in 1784 as part of the Herschel 400 Catalogue. The high age of the stars in the central region of NGC 3384 was confirmed after analysis of their color. More than 80% were found to be Population II stars which are over a billion years old.

Galaxy group information 

NGC 3384 is a member of the M96 Group, a group of galaxies in the constellation Leo that is sometimes referred to as the Leo I Group.  This group also includes the Messier objects M95, M96, and M105.  All of these objects are conspicuously close to each other in the sky.

References

External links 

 NGC 3384, position and other data
 NGC 3384 SIMBAD entry
 Pdf document: Stellar population analysis applied to NGC 3384
 Wikisky.org: SDSS image, NGC 3384
 

Lenticular galaxies
Barred lenticular galaxies
M96 Group
Leo (constellation)
3384
05911
32292
17840311